The National Equality March was a national political rally that occurred October 11, 2009 in Washington, D.C. It called for equal protection for lesbian, gay, bisexual, and transgender (LGBT) people in all matters governed by civil law in all 50 states and the District of Columbia. The march was called for by activist David Mixner and implemented by Cleve Jones, and organized by Equality Across America and the Courage Campaign. Kip Williams and Robin McGehee served as co-directors.  Leaders like actress Michelle Clunie, Courage Campaign marketing director, Billy Pollina and New York gubernatorial aide Peter Yacobellis hosted the first fundraiser in the spring of 2009. This was the first national march in Washington, D.C. for LGBT rights since the 2000 Millennium March.

Many groups joined by also organizing other events for the weekend, which coincided with National Coming Out Day on October 11 and marked eleven years since the beating and murder of gay University of Wyoming student Matthew Shepard, which prompted national attention and action to expand hate crime laws.

Equality Across America, which is fiscally sponsored by the non-profit Tides Center, states it intends to develop a network of decentralized organizers from each of the 435 U.S. Congressional districts.

History
Because organizers made extensive use of online social media tools to recruit and organize participants, the event was organized faster and more economically than those previous events. Organizers spent $156,000 to produce the event, and raised approximately $260,000. The surplus funds are being used by Equality Across America to pursue full Federal equality for LGBT people.

March route 
15th Street NW closed for staging between I Street NW and M Street NW. The march began at the intersection of I Street NW and 15th Street NW and initially headed south on Vermont Avenue NW then turned right on H Street NW. The march proceeded west past Lafayette Park, south on 17th Street NW, and then east on the closed portion of Pennsylvania Avenue immediately facing the White House before turning south on 15th Street NW. Finally, the march followed Pennsylvania Avenue to the United States Capitol.

Workshops
There were a series of workshops, including one on tactics for repealing "Don't Ask, Don't Tell", a law prohibiting gays and lesbians from serving openly in the armed forces. In addition, other workshops were on "How to Organize on Campus" and "Adoption Option: Adoption Is an Option." A "Transgender Community Building Caucus" was held. Cleve Jones and Sherry Wolf held a workshop at Busboys and Poets café, with several hundred attending, on The Struggle for LGBT Liberation.

Speakers

After the march a rally at the US Capitol featured more than 30 speakers, including:

 Jarrett Barrios – President of the Blue Cross and Blue Shield Foundation of Massachusetts and President of the Gay & Lesbian Alliance Against Defamation (GLAAD)
 Dustin Lance Black – American screenwriter, director, television producer, and LGBT rights activist
 Julian Bond – chairperson of NAACP and former Georgia State Senator who has often likened the US gay rights movement to the Civil Rights Movement, as he did in a Washington Post op-ed explaining his reasons for participating in the march
 Staceyann Chin – spoken word poet, performing artist and LGBT rights activist
 1st Lt. Daniel Choi – openly gay United States Army combat veteran and Arabic linguist whose discharge from the New York Army National Guard under the "Don't Ask, Don't Tell" policy is currently being reviewed
 Penelope Williams - Dominican American bisexual and immigration right activist, spokesperson for national bisexual rights group BiNet USA, officially introduced bisexual speaker Lady Gaga
 Lady Gaga – singer and bisexual-identified LGBTQ activist
 Michael Huffington – conservative bisexual activist, former United States Congressman, film producer
 Tanner Efinger – March Organizer and Founder of Postcards to the President
 Cleve Jones – the march’s co-chairperson and longtime gay rights activist
 David Mixner – civil rights activist and best-selling author
 Nicole Murray-Ramirez – LGBT rights activist and a San Diego city commissioner
 Chloe Michelle Noble – bi-queer human rights activist and founder of Homeless Youth Pridewalk and Operation Shine America
 Cynthia Nixon – lesbian-identified bisexual actress, most notably from Sex and the City
 Reverend Troy Deroy Perry II – founder of the Metropolitan Community Church
 Christine C. Quinn – first openly gay speaker of the New York City Council Speaker
 Bill Rosendahl – openly gay Los Angeles City Council member
 Judy Shepard – mother of brutally murdered gay University of Wyoming student Matthew Shepard and co-founder of the Matthew Shepard Foundation
 Babs Siperstein – the first openly transgender member of the Democratic National Committee
 Maxim Thorne – Senior Vice President of the NAACP
 Urvashi Vaid – LBGT activist
 Lawrence Webb – first openly gay, African-American elected official in the Commonwealth of Virginia, Falls Church City Council member
 Sherry Wolf -author, LGBT and socialist activist, associate editor of International Socialist Review
 Kit Yan – slam poet, musician, activist, and out transgender man

Endorsements

The National Equality March was endorsed by many of the major national LGBT organizations,  including GLAAD, HRC, MCC, the Task Force, and P-FLAG. In addition, it was endorsed by other organizations, such as the Screen Actors Guild, including many SAG members who individually endorsed the march as well. As well, the march was endorsed by other individuals, politicians, such as Senate Majority Leader Harry Reid, faith leaders such as Rabbi and President of North American Reform Judaism, Eric Yoffie, and others.

See also 

 List of protest marches on Washington, D.C.
 National Pride March (2017)

References

External links 

National Equality March official website
Equality Across America

2009 protests
2009 in LGBT history
2009 in Washington, D.C.
Don't ask, don't tell
LGBT civil rights demonstrations
LGBT events in Washington, D.C.
LGBT politics in the United States
LGBT rights in the United States
Marching
Protest marches in Washington, D.C.
October 2009 events in the United States